The Miller Cemetery Church near Silverton, Oregon was built in 1882.  It is a rare example in Oregon of a "burying church".

It was listed on the National Register of Historic Places in 1978.

References

National Register of Historic Places in Marion County, Oregon
Churches completed in 1882
Buildings and structures in Marion County, Oregon
1882 establishments in Oregon